Parthenice is a genus of flowering plants in the family Asteraceae.

Species
There is only one known species, Parthenice mollis, the annual monsterwort, native to Arizona (Pima, Santa Cruz, + Cochise Counties) and northwestern Mexico (Sonora, Chihuahua, Sinaloa, Baja California Sur).

Varieties
 Parthenice mollis var. mollis - Arizona, Sonora, Chihuahua, Sinaloa
 Parthenice mollis var. peninsularis Sauck - Baja California Sur

References

Heliantheae
Monotypic Asteraceae genera
Flora of North America